Prince Hohenlohe may refer to:
 Prince Chlodwig zu Hohenlohe-Schillingsfürst (1819–1901), Imperial Chancellor under William II
 Frederick Louis, Prince of Hohenlohe-Ingelfingen (1746–1818), commander at Jena